As Above, So Below is the second studio album by Zambian-born, Australian singer and songwriter Sampa the Great, released on 9 September 2022 through Loma Vista Recordings. The album was recorded in Zambia after Sampa the Great relocated there from Australia during the COVID-19 pandemic, and was announced in June 2022 alongside the release of the second single. As Above, So Below peaked at number 12 on the ARIA Charts.
 
In a statement accompanying the album's release, Sampa the Great said "After years of feeling like I had to represent and be an ambassador for everyone, I finally feel like I get to be an ambassador and fully represent myself."

The album was nominated for Australian Album of the Year at the 2022 J Awards.

The album was nominated for the 2022 Australian Music Prize.

Reception

Paul Simpson from AllMusic said "As Above, So Below takes influence from past and present styles of music from Zambia, Botswana (where Sampa was raised) and South Africa, sounding organic and earthy yet thoroughly contemporary. A much more concise record than the sprawling, jazzy The Return, As Above similarly celebrates heritage and culture while looking inward and discussing personal issues."

Kish Lal from The Guardian wrote, "Tied together by a desire for authenticity and marked by a ferocious culmination of frustration and self-actualisation, As Above, So Below is Tembo's most cohesive body of work yet." Lal concluded the review with "The underlying thesis of As Above, So Below is the revolutionary act of self-love, which is distilled in 'Let Me Be Great', featuring the Beninese singer Angeliqué Kidjo. A bright tangle of horns and soaring vocals from Kidjo is an emotional, full-circle moment teeming with mutual respect from one start to another."

Kyann-Sian Williams from NME said "The record is a heartfelt, honest homage to a country and continent, created by a powerful, unapologetic artist. This intelligent, harmonious and compelling album shows just how much Sampa the Great has grown over her years in the limelight."

James Mellen from Clash said "The beautiful blends of genres and crisp production make As Above, So Below an enthralling listen, and has Sampa raising the bar for herself once again."

Antoine-Samuel Mauffette Alavo from Exclaim! opined that "As Above, So Below signifies a transition in [Sampa the Great's] musical journey and an expansion of her creative palette. Sampa navigates the dichotomy of an African artist presenting traditional sounds to a Western audience. The rapper expertly interrogates the exoticist gaze and industry expectations while reconnecting to African soundscapes."

Stephen Kearse from Pitchfork found that "Sampa folds zamrock, polyrhythmic percussion and choral harmonies into her roving music. Though her rapping remains impersonal, she sounds renewed on these homegrown songs, the anxiety of her past music replaced with relief." Kearse added "The album is leaner and punchier than its restless predecessor, trading winding verses and interludes for streamlined songs of celebration... the songs prioritise rhythm and groove with a mix of live instrumentation and buoyant drum programming."

Double J said "While there have been some significant changes for album number two, plenty remains the same. Most notably, Sampa Tembo's raw skills as a lyricist and rapper. She spits with a confidence, clarity and passion that sounds genuinely inextinguishable across the album. As if she's never had more to say and never felt more comfortable saying it." In their 50 best albums of the year list, Double J placed As Above, So Below at 7th.

Track listing

Charts

References

2022 albums
Loma Vista Recordings albums
Sampa the Great albums